Karen Hanlen (born 28 March 1980) is a New Zealand mountain biker. She represented New Zealand at the 2012 Summer Olympics in London, competing in the women's cross-country cycling event.

Biography
Hanlen was born in Whakatāne in 1980. She is married with two children, and works as a physiotherapist at Whakatāne Hospital. In 2010, she switched from mountain running to mountain biking, buying her first performance bike on Trade Me. She was the only woman who represented New Zealand at the 2012 Summer Olympics in mountain biking, beating Rosara Joseph for the sole spot.

Olympic career 
Hanlen competed for New Zealand in the women's mountain biking cross country at the 2012 Summer Olympics in London. She finished 18th, with a time of 1:37:54.

Achievements

References

External links 
 Facebook fan page of Karen Hanlen

1980 births
Living people
New Zealand female cyclists
New Zealand mountain bikers
Cross-country mountain bikers
Olympic cyclists of New Zealand
Cyclists at the 2012 Summer Olympics
Sportspeople from Whakatāne
People educated at Whakatane High School
Cyclists at the 2014 Commonwealth Games
Commonwealth Games competitors for New Zealand